The Associação de Futebol de Aveiro (Aveiro Football Association) is one of the 22 District Football Associations that are affiliated to the Portuguese Football Federation. The AF Aveiro administers lower tier football in the district of Aveiro.

Background 
Associação de Futebol de Aveiro, commonly referred to as AF Aveiro, is the governing body for football in the district of Aveiro which covers the 19 municipalities of Anadia, Albergaria a Velha, Agueda, Aveiro, Arouca, Castelo Paiva, Espinho, Estarreja, Oliveira Azemeis, Oliveira Bairro, Ovar, Mealhada, Murtosa, Ilhavo, Sever do Vouga, São João Madeira, Santa Maria da Feira, Vagos and Vale de Cambra. The Football Association is based in Aveiro. The Association's President for the 2015-2019 quadrennium, is Arménio Pinho elected in May/2015.

The organisation was established on 22 September 1924 at the initiative of a distinguished group of leaders led by Mario Duarte.

The early clubs included:

Associação Desportiva Ovarense
Associação Desportiva Sanjoanense
Clube dos Galitos (Aveiro)
Fogueirese Foot Ball Clube
Paços Brandão Foot Ball Clube
Sociedade Recreio Artístico (Aveiro)
Sport Clube Anadia
Sport Clube Beira-Mar
Sporting Clube Bustelo
Sporting Clube Espinho
Sporting Clube Oliveirense
União Desportiva Oliveirense

The first formal meeting of the Board was held on 14 November 1924.

Competitions
Several Aveiro clubs compete in the three national levels of the Portuguese football league system in competitions run by the Portuguese League for Professional Football (Primeira Liga/Liga NOS and Segunda Liga) and Portuguese Football Federation (Campeonato Nacional de Seniores).

In the 2015/16 season, FC Arouca play in the Primeira Liga/Liga NOS, while CD Feirense and UD Oliveirense compete in the Segunda Liga.

Below the Campeonato Nacional de Seniores the competitions are organised at a district level (known in Portuguese as Distritais) with each District Association organising its competitions according to geographical and other factors. 

The AF Aveiro runs several league competitions with the Division One (1ª Divisão) being at the fourth level of the league system.

In more general terms the AF Aveiro currently organises District Championships for football and Futsal for men and women for all age groups including Senior, Junior, Youth, Beginners, Infants and Schools.

AF Aveiro clubs competing in national level - 2015/16 Season

Primeira Liga/Liga NOS (tier 1)
 FC Arouca

Segunda Liga (tier 2)
 UD Oliveirense
 CD Feirense

CN Seniores (tier 3)
 AD Sanjoanense
 Anadia FC
 FC Cesarense
 CD Estarreja
 GD Gafanha
 Lusitânia Lourosa
 SC Bustelo
 FC Pampilhosa
 SC Beira-Mar

AF Aveiro Divisions - 2015/16 Season

AF Aveiro organizes the following divisions covering the fourth and fifth tiers of the Portuguese football league system.

Division One (1ª divisão)

 Sporting Clube de Espinho - Relegated from CN Seniores
 Sporting Clube de São João de Ver - Relegated from CN Seniores
 Recreio Desportivo de Águeda
 Clube de Futebol União de Lamas
 Sport Clube Alba
 Sporting Clube de Esmoriz
 Fiães Sport Clube
 Juventude Desportiva Carregosense
 Associação Atlética de Avanca
 Grupo Desportivo Milheiroense
 Sporting Clube Paivense
 Oliveira do Bairro Sport Clube
 Grupo Desportivo de Calvão
 Atlético Clube de Cucujães
 Clube Desportivo de Paços de Brandão – Promoted from AF Aveiro Division 2
 Associação Desportiva Valonguense – Promoted from AF Aveiro Division 2
 Atlético Clube de Famalicão – Promoted from AF Aveiro Division 2
 Grupo Desportivo São Roque – Promoted from AF Aveiro Division 2

Division Two (2ª divisão)

Série A

 Canedo FC – Relegated from AF Aveiro Div.1
 CD Soutense – Relegated from AF Aveiro Div.1
 ACRD Mosteirô
 AD Argoncilhe
 ADC Lobão
 ADC Sanguêdo
 Caldas de São Jorge SC
 CCR S.Martinho 
 CD Arrifanense
 FC Cesarense B
 FC Macieirense
 GD Sta Cruz de Alvarenga
 JA Rio Meão
 Mosteirô FC
 Romariz FC
 RC Nogueirense
 UD Mansores

Série B

 SC Beira Mar – Demoted from Segunda Liga
 AD Ovarense– Relegated from AF Aveiro Div.1
 UD Mourisquense – Releg.from AF Aveiro Div.1
 AA Macinhatense
 ADCR Oiã
 AD Requeixo
 AD Santiais
 AD Valecambrense
 ARC São Vicente Pereira
 CCR Válega
 CRC Rocas do Vouga
 CDC Macieira Cambra
 CD Furadouro
 FC Pinheirense
 GD Beira-Vouga
 SC Vista Alegre
 SC Fermentelos

Série C

 GD Mealhada – Relegated from AF Aveiro Div.1
 AD Paredes do Bairro
 ADC Freguesia Sto André
 ADRC Ribeira Azenha
 ADC Sosense
 ADC Vila Nova de Monsarros
 Anadia FC B
 AR Aguinense
 CCD Couvelha
 CD Luso
 CRAC
 CR Antes
 GD Águas Boas
 Juve Force Ponte Vagos
 LAAC
 Mamarrosa FC
 SC Carqueijo

Former participants
Other clubs that have competed in the Distritais since the 1992/93 season include:

Ajax Desportivo e Cultural da Silvã
Arada Atlético Clube
Associação Académica da Universidade de Aveiro
Associação Cultural e Recreativa de Avelãs de Caminho
Associação Cultural e Recreativa de Mansores
Associação Cultural e Recreativa de Sardoura
Associação Cultural e Recreativa Oliveirense Futebol Clube
Associação Cultural, Desportiva, Recreativa, Beneficiente e Solidariedade Social do Troviscal
Associação Desportiva Águias de Carrazedo
Associação Desportiva Amoreirense
Associação Desportiva e Cultural São Jacinto
Associação Desportiva Severense
Associação Recreativa e Cultural da Borralha - BARC
Associação Recreativa e Cultural de Barroca
Associação Recreativa e Cultural de Vilarinho do Bairro
Casal Comba Real Clube
Centro Cultural Desportivo Recreativo Covão Lobo
Centro Cultural e Recreativo Vila Viçosa
Centro Desportivo e Cultural de São Martinho Gândara
CIDEP - Centro Iniciação Desportiva Escolar e Popular
Clube Académico do Canedo
Clube Cultural e Desportivo Torreira-Praia
Clube Estrela Azul
Clube Futebol Azuis do Fial
Desportivo Clube Fornos

Frente Impulsionadora Desporto e Cultura - FIDEC
Futebol Clube de Barcouço
Futebol Clube de Pigeiros
Futebol Clube de Samel
Futebol Clube de Serém
Futebol Clube Santa Joana
Futebol Clube Vaguense
Grupo Cultural e Desportivo de Sanfins
Grupo Desportivo Azurva
Grupo Desportivo Cultural de Recardães
Grupo Desportivo da Fogueira
Grupo Desportivo Mogofores
Grupo Desportivo Eixense
Grupo Desportivo Fajões
Grupo Desportivo Folclórico de Palmaz
Grupo Desportivo Moitense
Grupo Desportivo Pedorido
Juventude Académica Pessegueirense
Juventude Atlética Os Amigos do Cavaco
Mocidade Desportiva Eirolense
Novo Estrela da Gafanha da Encarnação - NEGE
Sport Benfica e Gafanha
Sport Clube de Paradela
Sport Marítimo Murtoense
Sporting Clube de Santa Maria da Feira
Sporting Clube Poutena
Sporting Clube Rio Meão

District Championships

Historic champions

Titles
 SC Espinho - 10
 AD Ovarense - 5
 AD Sanjoanense - 3
 SC Beira-Mar - 2
 CF União de Lamas - 2
 UD Oliveirense - 1

Divisional champions

List of member clubs

Footnote
 1-10 games in Portuguese Cup.     *
 11-100 games in Portuguese Cup.  * *
 101+ games in Portuguese Cup.     * * *

See also
 Portuguese District Football Associations
 Portuguese football competitions
 List of football clubs in Portugal

References

External links
  
 Associação de Futebol de Aveiro Official website 

Aveiro
Sports organizations established in 1924